Morgantown is the name of three unincorporated communities in Mississippi, United States:

 Morgantown, Adams County, Mississippi, a census-designated place
 Morgantown, Marion County, Mississippi
 Morgantown, Oktibbeha County, Mississippi